Master Minds is an American game show airing on the Game Show Network. The show debuted on June 10, 2019, under the title Best Ever Trivia Show, hosted by Sherri Shepherd and regularly featuring Ken Jennings, Muffy Marracco, Jonathan Corbblah, Arianna Haut, and Ryan Chaffee. A first season with the show retitled Master Minds debuted on April 6, 2020, hosted by Brooke Burns.

On November 18, 2020, it was announced that the second season would premiere on December 7, 2020.

On March 25, 2021, GSN renewed the show for a third season, which premiered on January 9, 2023, with Mark Labbett joining as an expert.

Gameplay
In both cases, the show features three contestants competing against three "trivia experts." The pool of eight experts includes Ken Jennings, Muffy Marracco, Raj Dhuwalia, Arianna Haut, Ryan Chaffee, Susannah Brooks, David Schuchinski, and Jonathan Corbblah. The winning contestant faces off against the best-performing expert in the "Ultimate Trivia Challenge."

Best Ever Trivia Show

Round 1
In the first round, one of the contestants selects one of two categories for the round, and then also selects one of the three experts to play along with the round. The contestants are asked four questions in the category, each question has three multiple-choice options. Everyone (including the other two experts) secretly and simultaneously locks in their answers, a contestant's correct answer is worth 50 points if the chosen expert got it right, and 100 points if not.
Answers given by the experts not chosen are generally not revealed.

Round 2
The second round is played similarly to the first round. However:
 The category not selected in the first round is made available again, along with a new category.
 The selection of category and expert is now made by the leading contestant.
 A different expert must be selected.
 There are only three questions in this round.
 The value for each question is now 100 points if the expert gets it right, and 200 points if not.

Round 3
The last remaining expert plays in this round, and the leading contestant chooses one of two new categories. Unlike in the previous rounds, the chosen expert secretly submits an answer first, and then, without disclosing their answer, states how confident they are in their answer. Based on the expert's stated confidence level, and their own knowledge, the contestants may either use the expert's answer, sight unseen, for 200 points, or try to select the correct answer themselves for 400 points. This round lasts for a maximum of three questions, the contestant with the most points at the end of this round wins $1,000 and plays the "Ultimate Trivia Challenge.“ If it becomes mathematically impossible for both of the trailing players to overtake the leader, the game ends immediately.

In the event of a tie, the players involved in the tie are asked one additional question. The player who submits the correct answer the fastest wins the game.

Ultimate Trivia Challenge
The day's winner plays the Ultimate Trivia Challenge against the expert who performed the best on all questions asked during the game (based on most correct answers and fastest time). The contestant and the expert are asked five questions, again with three multiple choice options. Whoever answers more questions correctly wins the round, if this is the contestant, their winnings are increased to $10,000. If either of the two participants is unable to catch up, the round ends immediately.

If the scores are tied after five questions, then the contestant is asked the "Ultimate Trivia Question," a question chosen by all three experts offstage before the show. The contestant also wins the $10,000 if they answer the Ultimate Trivia Question correctly.

A contestant who wins the $10,000, whether by outscoring the expert or by correctly answering the Ultimate Trivia Question, returns to play again on the next show. Any contestant that wins the Ultimate Trivia Challenge three times is invited back for future shows to play as an expert in addition to their total winnings of $30,000.

Master Minds
In this season, all six participants compete against one another in three rounds. Point scores are kept for both contestants and experts (now called "Master Minds"), and the winners of both groups face off in the Ultimate Trivia Challenge.

Round 1
All six participants are asked seven questions, each on a different topic, and each with three multiple choice options. All participants secretly and simultaneously lock in their answers, each correct answer is worth 100 points.

Round 2
This round consists of five open-ended questions, each on a different topic. The first four questions are worth 200 points, and the last 400 points. After the question is read, the contestants and Master Minds buzz in for the right to answer. Only the first contestant and first Master Mind to buzz in can answer. If the answer is correct, the points are added to those participants' scores, but in this round, incorrect answers result in a score deduction. After the 400-point question is asked, the lowest-scoring contestant and lowest-scoring Master Mind are eliminated from further play. In the event of a tie for lowest score, a tiebreaker question is played on the buzzers between the tied participants, answers are given verbally in the tiebreaker. If a player answers correctly, they advance to the next round (no points are awarded for winning a tiebreaker). If they give an incorrect answer or no answer, they are eliminated.

For the third season, round 2 was changed to remove the buzz-in element; all contestants and Master Minds write in their answers for all five questions. Points are also no longer deducted for incorrect answers.

Round 3
In this round, all questions are asked on the buzzers, and answers are given verbally. The two contestants face off for 60 seconds. In the first two seasons, the clock started at the beginning of the first question; starting in the third season, the clock starts when the first question is completed. The first question is worth 500 points, and each subsequent question is worth 100 points more. As in Round 2, contestants cannot buzz in until the question is completed, but unlike Round 2, there is no penalty for incorrect answers; instead, their opponent can steal the points with a correct answer. The contestant with the higher score wins $1,000. The Master Minds compete with the same format, on a new set of questions, to determine which Master Mind will take on the winning contestant in the Ultimate Trivia Challenge. If there is a tie, a tiebreaker as in Round 2 is played.

Ultimate Trivia Challenge/Showdown
For the first season, this round consisted of five open-ended questions. The contestant answers the questions while the Master Mind is isolated offstage, the Master Mind then returns to the stage to answer the same five questions. The correct answers are revealed after both the contestant and Master Mind have played.

For the second season, the format was changed so that both the contestant and the Master Mind are onstage at the same time, writing their answers simultaneously. The correct answers are revealed after both participants have revealed their answers. The round ends immediately if it becomes impossible for the trailing player to tie (e.g., a score of 3–0).

For the third season, the Ultimate Trivia Showdown was reduced to four questions.

The contestant wins the round either by outscoring the Master Mind, or by tying and then correctly answering the Ultimate Trivia Question. If the contestant wins the round, they win $10,000 and return on the next show. As before, if the contestant wins the $10,000 three times (two times in season 3), they are invited to become a Master Mind.

To date, two contestants have accomplished this: Kelly Gerhold and Lauren Cusitello both won in February 2023 after the rule change lowering the threshold for winning to two wins for season 3.

Production
The show's first season premiered on June 10, 2019, and ran every weekday for 65 episodes until September 6, 2019. A new show in 2020 was announced, along with a name change to Master Minds and Brooke Burns replacing Sherri Shepherd as host. Master Minds debuted with a new format on April 6, 2020, with 65 episodes until June 26, 2020. The second season began airing on December 7, 2020. For the second season, due to the ongoing COVID-19 pandemic in the United States, the contestants and Master Minds are spaced further apart (and the Master Minds now have individual podiums).

References

External links

2010s American game shows
2019 American television series debuts
2020s American game shows
Game Show Network original programming